The 1994 Giro d'Italia was the 77th edition of the race. The Giro started off in Bologna on 22 May with a short  stage. The race came to a close on 12 June with a flat stage that stretched  from Turin to Milan. Seventeen teams entered the race, which was won by Evgeni Berzin of the  team. Second and third respectively were the Italian Marco Pantani and the Spanish rider, Miguel Induráin.

Berzin first gained the race lead after the fourth stage where he attacked on the final climb to win the day. The race's overall classification was first headed by Endrio Leoni who won the Giro's opening road stage. However, Leoni lost the lead later that day during the afternoon individual time trial to Armand de Las Cuevas. De Las Cuevas held the lead for a single stage before losing it to Moreno Argentin who won the race's second stage. Argentin held the general classification lead for two stages, before Berzin took it after stage 4. After gaining the lead, Berzin began to build upon his advantage after winning the stage 8 and 18 individual time trials and maintaining good form throughout the mountains.

Berzin became the first Russian to win the Giro d'Italia. Berzin also won the young rider classification for the best rider aged 25 or under in the general classification.

Teams

A total of 18 teams were invited to participate in the 1994 Giro d'Italia, of which 17 participated. Each team sent a squad of nine riders, so the Giro began with a peloton of 153 cyclists. Italy had the most riders participating with 80, while Germany (12) was the only country representation by more than 10 riders. Of these, 37 were riding the Giro d'Italia for the first time. The average age of riders was 27.95 years, ranging from 21–year–old Heinrich Trumheller to 36–year–old Bruno Leali. The presentation of the teams – where each team's roster and manager were introduced in front the media and local dignitaries – took place on 22 May, in the courtyard of the Bologna. Of the riders that started this edition of the Giro d'Italia, a total of 99 riders made it to the finish in Milan.

The teams entering the race were:

Pre-race favorites

The starting peloton included 1993 winner, Miguel Induráin, who came into the race having only raced twenty days during the season according to author Bill McGann. In addition, there were reports surfacing before the race that Indurain's knee was troubling him. The race did not feature Tony Rominger, who elected to ride the Vuelta a España instead. El País writer Carlos Arribas felt that Evgeni Berzin had a strong spring with his victory in Liège–Bastogne–Liège and second-place finish in the Tour of the Basque Country. Arribas felt that Russian Pavel Tonkov, who had won the young rider classification the previous two years, would challenge for the victory as his normal team leader, Maurizio Fondriest, was absent from the race due to injury.

Avui'''s Adrian R. Huber believed that Djamolidine Abdoujaparov, Adriano Baffi, and Fabio Baldato had a great chance to win a stage in the race. Notable sprinter Mario Cipollini did not participate in the race as he was still recovering from injuries sustained in the second stage at the Vuelta a España.

Route and stages

The route for the 1994 Giro d'Italia was unveiled by race director Carmine Castellano on 13 November 13, 1993, in Milan. The race route was leaked to the press before Castellano held the official presentation. It contained three time trial events, all of which were individual. There were ten stages containing high mountains, of which three had summit finishes: stage 4, to Campitello Matese; stage 20, to Les Deux Alpes; and stage 21, to Sestriere. Another stage with a mountain-top finish was stage 18, which consisted of a climbing time trial to the summit of the Passo dello Bocco. In total, the race featured  of climbing. The organizers chose to include no rest days. When compared to the previous year's race, the race was  longer, contained one less rest day, and one more stage. The race was televised in Italy by Mediaset TV.

There were five stages that began or ended outside of Italy. Stage 12 ended in the Slovenian city Kranj and served as the start for the race's thirteenth stage. Stage 13 ended at Lienz in Austria, and the fourteenth began there. The Giro's mountainous stage 20 ended on the slopes of Les Deux Alpes, and the penultimate stage began on the mountain the next day.

Race overview

This edition of the Giro began with a split stage, with the morning leg consisting of a  flat route and the afternoon part being a  flat individual time trial. Italian Endrio Leoni won the morning stage by means of a sprint finish where the speeds were so high the peloton split in the final kilometer. Armand de Las Cuevas won the afternoon time trial by two seconds over Evgeni Berzin and in the process took the overall lead away from Leoni. Stage two featured an uphill finish into the city of Osimo. Moreno Argentin attacked close to the line and was able to distance himself from the rest of the peloton and win the stage, while also taking the lead of the race. Gianni Bugno failed several times to get away from the peloton before finally breaking free on the climb into Loreto Amprutino to win the third stage.

Stage 4 featured the race's first summit finish, with a final climb to the top of Campitello Matese. While on the climb, Evgeni Berzin attacked and made his way up to the top in first place. Due to his efforts, Berzin gained the overall lead of the race. The next two stages, 5 and 6, both came down to sprint finishes that were won by Endrio Leoni and Marco Saligari, respectively. The race's seventh stage saw the Spaniard Laudelino Cubino outsprint his fellow breakaway members for the stage victory. Stage 8 was a  individual time trial that stretched from Grosseto to Follonica. The race leader Evgeni Berzin dominated the time trial as he won the stage by over a minute than the second-place finisher, which also allowed him to extend his lead in the general classification.

The next three stages of the race were all primarily flat, had no real impact on the overall standings, and all concluded with a bunch sprint. Ján Svorada won stage nine and then stage eleven after dodging a crash that marred the stage's finish. Djamolidine Abdoujaparov out-sprinted the rest of the field to win the race's tenth stage. The Giro's twelfth stage featured a few categorized climbs as the race made its way into Slovenia for the stage's finish in Kranj. Despite the climbs, the stage ended with a field sprint that was won by Andrea Ferrigato. Italian Michele Bartoli won the race's undulating thirteenth stage by being a part of the stage's initial breakaway and then attacking later on and soloing to the stage's conclusion in Lienz, Austria.

As the Giro left Austria, the race began to enter the Dolomites during stage fourteen. The eventual stage winner Marco Pantani was in a chasing group on the final climb of the stage, the Passo di Monte Giovo. He attacked, bridged the gap to the leading group, and left them behind to claim his first professional victory of his career. The next stage saw Pantani win again after he rode away from the attack group on the last climb of the Valico di Santa Cristina and he then soloed to the finish in Aprica. Pantani's efforts on the day moved him up to second overall in the race. The race's sixteenth stage took a break from the mountains with the stage being primarily fled, which ultimately led to the sprint finish that was won by Italian Maximilian Sciandri. Ján Svorada won the next day's stage after attacking from the breakaway group in the closing seconds.

The Giro's eighteenth stage was a  individual time trial that stretched from Chiavari to the summit finish on the Passo del Bocco. The race leader Evgeni Berzin won the stage by twenty seconds over Miguel Induráin. Stage 19 saw the day of racing come down to a sprint finish that was won by Massimo Ghirotto. The twentieth stage saw the Giro race through the Alps and up to the summit of Les Deux Alpes for the stage finish. The lead group up Les Deux Alpes contained the likes of Evgeni Berzin, Marco Pantani, and Miguel Induráin who had attacked each other multiple times but to no avail. The trio was later joined by Vladimir Poulnikov and Nelson Rodríguez who both eventually left them to go on for the stage win. Poulkinov edged out Rodriguez to the stage win atop the mountain. The penultimate stage of the Giro saw a summit finish atop the Sestriere. The stage saw snow and chilling temperatures which led to the general classification contenders sticking together, while Pascal Richard went on to win the summit finish and solidify his lead atop the mountains classification. The Giro's final stage came down to a sprint finish that was won by Stefano Zanini as Evgeni Berzin won the Giro d'Italia.

Success in stages was limited to eleven of the competing teams, six of which achieved multiple stage victories, while four individual riders won multiple stages. The riders that won more than once were Endrio Leoni in stages 1a and 5, Evgeni Berzin in stages 4, 8, and 18, Ján Svorada in stages 9, 11, and 17, and Marco Pantani in stages 14 and 15. Jolly Componibili-Cage won two stages with Leoni. Gewiss–Ballan won multiple stages, with Moreno Argentin in stage 2 and three stages with Berzin.  won two stages, with Gianni Bugno in stage 3 and Djamolidine Abdoujaparov in stage 10. GB–MG Maglificio won three stages, with Marco Saligari in stage 6, Maximilian Sciandri in stage 16, and Pascal Richard in stage 21.  won three stages with Ján Svorada. ZG Mobili–Selle Italia won two stages, with Andrea Ferrigato in stage 12 and Massimo Ghirotto in stage 19.  also won multiple stages, with Marco Pantani in winning two stages and Vladimir Poulnikov in stage 20.

Castorama, and  each won one stage apiece. Castorama rider Armand de Las Cuevas won stage 1b individual time trial, Kelme-Avianca-Gios's Laudelino Cubino won stage 7, Mercatone Uno-Medeghini rider Michele Bartoli won stage 13, and Navigare-Blue Storm's Stefano Zanini stage 22 by means of a sprint finish.

Doping

Despite not testing positive during the race or season, the Gewiss–Ballan team has since been speculated to have executed a systematic doping program that utilized EPO throughout the 1994 season. The team achieved several victories in stage races and one-day races during the year, including a sweep of the podium at La Flèche Wallonne weeks before the start of the Giro. Team doctor Michele Ferrari was banned for life from sports in 2012 by United States Anti-Doping Agency for distribution of performance-enhancing drugs to several of his clients.

Classification leadership

Five different jerseys were worn during the 1994 Giro d'Italia. The leader of the general classification – calculated by adding the stage finish times of each rider, and allowing time bonuses for the first three finishers on mass-start stages – wore a pink jersey. The time bonuses for the 1994 Giro were twelve seconds for first, eight for second, and four seconds for third. This classification is the most important of the race, and its winner is considered as the winner of the Giro.

For the points classification, which awarded a purple (or cyclamen) jersey to its leader, cyclists were given points for finishing a stage in the top 15; additional points could also be won in intermediate sprints. The green jersey was awarded to the mountains classification leader. In this ranking, points were won by reaching the summit of a climb ahead of other cyclists. Each climb was ranked as either first, second or third category, with more points available for higher category climbs. The Cima Coppi, the race's highest point of elevation, awarded more points than the other first category climbs. The Cima Coppi'' for this Giro was the Stelvio Pass. The first rider to cross the Stelvio was Italian Franco Vona. The white jersey was worn by the leader of young rider classification, a ranking decided the same way as the general classification, but only riders born after 1 January 1970 were eligible for it. The intergiro classification was marked by a blue jersey. The calculation for the intergiro is similar to that of the general classification, in each stage there is a midway point that the riders pass through a point and where their time is stopped. As the race goes on, their times compiled and the person with the lowest time is the leader of the intergiro classification and wears the blue jersey. The first three riders to cross the intergiro line in each stage would receive a six, four, and two second time bonus, respectively. Although no jersey was awarded, there was also one classification for the teams, in which the stage finish times of the best three cyclists per team were added; the leading team was the one with the lowest total time.

The rows in the following table correspond to the jerseys awarded after that stage was run.

Final standings

General classification

Points classification

Mountains classification

Young rider classification

Intergiro classification

Team classification

Team points classification

References

Citations

 
1994
Giro d'Italia
Giro d'Italia
May 1994 sports events in Europe
June 1994 sports events in Europe